The Right Place Right Time Tour was the second concert tour by British recording artist Olly Murs. The tour supported his third studio album Right Place Right Time (2012). In November 2013 a DVD of the O2 date was released as part of a special edition of the album.

Critical reception
While reviewing the opening show of the tour, Gordon Barr of Evening Chronicle praised the whole show commenting, "what a refreshing change to see a performer up there on stage genuinely enjoying himself." Barr also compared Murs to Robbie Williams. Katie Pavid from The Journal wrote that the "show proved emphatically that he is capable of creating bold reggae-pop with soulful overtones, as well as being completely in control of an enthralled audience."

Opening acts
Loveable Rogues (Europe, Leg 1)
Tich (Europe, Leg 1)
Before You Exit (North America, Leg 2)
Bonnie Anderson (Australia)
Diana Vickers (Middlesbrough)
Amelia Lily (Middlesbrough)

Setlist
The following setlist was obtained from the concert held on 2 April 2013, at The O in Dublin, Ireland. It does not represent all concerts for the duration of the tour. 
"Army of Two"
"Dance with Me Tonight"
"Personal"
"Thinking of Me"
"I've Tried Everything"
"I Need You Now"
"Hey You Beautiful"
"I'm OK"
"Hand on Heart"
"Loud and Clear"
"Busy" / "Heart on My Sleeve"
"Careless Whisper" / "Reet Petite" / "C'est la vie" / "Crazy in Love"
"Please Don't Let Me Go"
"Dear Darlin'"
"One of These Days"
"Oh My Goodness"
"Heart Skips a Beat"
Encore
"Right Place Right Time"
"Troublemaker"

Tour dates

Festivals and other miscellaneous performances
This concert was a part of the "Kiss 108 Concert"
This concert was a part of the "Summertime Ball"
This concert was a part of "Live at the Marquee"
This concert was a part of the "Rays of Sunshine Concert"
This concert was a part of "Alton Towers Live"
This concert was a part of "Pori Jazz"
This concert was a part of "Party in the Park"
This concert was a part of "Key 103 Live"
This concert was a part of "V Festival"
This concert was a part of the "Gibraltar Music Festival"

Box office score data

References

2013 concert tours